

External links
Official website

 
hurling
Seasons Cork
Cork